Chrysochroa vittata is a species of beetle in the Buprestidae family.

Description
Elytra normally are metallic green, with metallic red and blue longitudinal stripes. The legs are bright green. These wood-boring beetles show a striking example of the colour-changing feature called iridescence. Their metallic colours derive from structural colours created by multilayers  in the cuticle. The insect may appear red, greenish or completely green depending on the light incidence.

Distribution
This species can be found from India to China and Thailand.

References
 Biolib
 Gondwana
   Insect Integument and Colour
 Polarized iridescence of the multilayered elytra of the Japanese jewel beetle

Buprestidae
Beetles described in 1775
Taxa named by Johan Christian Fabricius